Buvik Church is a parish church of the Church of Norway in Skaun municipality in Trøndelag county, Norway. It is located in the village of Buvika. It is the church for the Buvik parish which is part of the Orkdal prosti (deanery) in the Diocese of Nidaros. The white, wooden church was built in an octagonal style in 1819 using plans drawn up by an unknown architect. The church seats about 250 people.

History
The earliest existing historical records of the church date back to the 1300s, but the church was likely first built in the 1200s. Not much is known about the first church building. By the 1600s, this church had fallen into disrepair and was in need of replacement. In 1658, the church was torn down and a new church was built on the same site. In June 1728, large masses of clay and soil slid into the river Vigda, just west of the church. This put the foundations of the church in grave danger in the event that more land was to slide towards the river. The church was emptied out within a few days and then the church was taken down.

In 1803, the church was said to be in quite poor condition and that the Bishop had ordered a new church to be built. It was several years before this happened. The new building was consecrated in September 1823. The church was built by the carpenter Johan Nordset who based the plans off of the nearby Klæbu Church. In 1861, the tower was struck by lightning and it had to be rebuilt. In 1978, a sacristy was built on the east side of the church.

See also
List of churches in Nidaros
Octagonal churches in Norway

References

Skaun
Churches in Trøndelag
Octagonal churches in Norway
Wooden churches in Norway
19th-century Church of Norway church buildings
Churches completed in 1819
13th-century establishments in Norway